The Oyster Bay History Walk is a path through downtown Oyster Bay, New York  that leads the walker to 30 historic sites.  It is a 1-mile loop and is the first certified American Heart Association Start! Walking Path on Long Island.

Origins and development
The first settlers arrived in Oyster Bay in the 1650s; the Town of Oyster Bay seal includes the date 1653. Over the ensuing 350 years several important events in the religious, military, and social history of Colonial America and the United States occurred there. A few of these events and the people associated with them are celebrated in the History Walk. Seven of the sites included on the History Walk are also listed on the National Register of Historic Places.

The tour was designed through the collaborative efforts of historian John Hammond, Oyster Bay Historical Society Director Thomas A. Kuehhas, and sound recording artist Claire Bellerjeau.

An audio commentary was created to accompany the maps to enable interested walkers to understand the significance of each of the sites on the Walk. These tracks were originally released under the title Talk of the Town, but the name was changed to the Oyster Bay History Walk in 2008 at the time of certification by the American Heart Association as the first Start! Walking Path on Long Island.

Sites on the Walk
Details of the locations of the site on the walk are available on the linked map.

1. Introduction
The Walk starts at the Baykery Cafe with a general introduction to Oyster Bay and its history.

While many people know Oyster Bay as the home of Theodore Roosevelt there is, of course, much more to tell. Before the first arrivals of European colonials over 350 years ago the Matinecock Indians settled in the area at least a thousand years ago. Dutch and English merchants, fishermen, and shipbuilders later made this a lively center of maritime trade. One of George Washington’s most important spies Robert Townsend lived here. The notorious pirate Captain Kidd visited for a short time, as did Typhoid Mary.

2. Fleet's Hall

Fleet's Hall is a building that once stood in Oyster Bay, New York. The building served as an important civic and social meeting place during the time that Theodore Roosevelt was a resident of Oyster Bay and served as Governor of New York State and later President of the United States. The building was used for events such as public meetings, concerts, receptions, dances, and dinners. It was also the site of the first moving picture screening in Oyster Bay.

3. Moore's Building

Following a fire James Moore built a new grocery store in 1901 incorporating portions of a brick façade first built in 1891. As well as the large ground floor he included two high-ceilinged upper floors for public meetings. It was in these upper floors that President Roosevelt located his Summer Executive Offices. Secretary William Loeb, Jr. and his staff conducted any business of the president here that did not require his personal attention. Direct "hotlines" connected to Sagamore Hill and the White House. In 1903 the first "round the world" cable was transmitted from this building. Moore's Building is listed on the U.S. National Register of Historic Places (NRHP).

4. Oyster Bay Bank Building

This building was constructed in 1891 and served as the first bank in the town, it originally consisted of 3½ stories as well as a basement. The directors of the Oyster Bay Bank leased the third floor to the Masons of Matinecock Lodge #806, the second floor to various doctors and lawyers, part of the basement to a pool hall and tobacco shop, and used the first floor for the bank.

When Roosevelt was Governor of New York in 1900 he rented several rooms on the second floor. In 1901 he became a member of the Matinecock Lodge, and attended meetings on the third floor.

Originally the building was set back from the sidewalk about ten feet with a flight of wide stops leading up to the entrance. However, in 1927 the building was lowered and brought forward to the street. As a result, customers can enter the main floor directly from street level. Following this a 3-story extension was added to the back of the building. Recently, the building has undergone extensive renovation, both inside and out.

5. Derby-Hall Bandstand

The bandstand was once used by Roosevelt and others to give speeches. The original bandstand was removed in the 1930s and in 1981 a replica took its place. It is once again used for public speakers. The original intention was to dedicate the replica to Roosevelt's daughter Ethel Roosevelt Derby. However, her godson Leonard Wood Hall, a New York Congressman and Oyster Bay native, died shortly before completion. As he had been the principal organizer of the rebuilding project it was dedicated to him as well as Ethel.

There are three cannon around the bandstand.

The one facing the Town Hall is a Civil War era Dahlgren gun, named for its inventor Rear Admiral John A. Dahlgren. At the base of this cannon is a tablet cast from metal recovered from the wreck of the USS Maine. The explosion that caused this wreckage contributed to the decision to begin the Spanish–American War of 1898 (in which Roosevelt eagerly participated and gained fame).

The cannon at the foot of the stairs is a circa 1861 Civil War trophy gun from the USS R. R. Cuyler. The R. R. Cuyler was a 1202-ton wooden steamship chartered by the Union Navy to enforce a blockade of Florida’s west coast. It is a 30-pound Parrott rifle and weighs 3,510 lb. It was presented to Oyster Bay by the Navy and unveiled by President Roosevelt in 1903.

6. U.S. Post Office

While there have been at least four site for the Oyster Bay Post Office, the current building was the first to be architecturally designed. New York architect William Bottomley designed this building to be a mirror image of the Town Hall building on the opposite side of the street. Building was completed in 1936. Several artists were then commissioned to decorate the interior. The artists included Ernest Peixotto, who with his assistant contributed several murals representing Oyster Bay's history, and Leo Lentelli, an Italian sculptor, who created terracotta panels above the interior doorways, a terracotta bust of Theodore Roosevelt, and a stone flagpole base on the grounds outside the Post Office. The building is listed on the National Register of Historic Places.

7. Long Island Rail Road Station

The Oyster Bay Railroad Station is the terminus of this branch of the Long Island Railroad. The first station was built in 1889 and then expanded in 1901 at the time of Roosevelt's election as President to accommodate the large increase in guests to the hamlet. A new station was built nearby in the late 20th century to accommodate double-decker trains. The original building is currently being transformed into the Oyster Bay Railroad Museum. This building is listed on the National Register of Historic Places.

8. Theodore Roosevelt Memorial Park

The land Theodore Roosevelt Memorial Park rests on was originally a salt marsh used for raising cattle. Theodore Roosevelt once said of the area of the future park, “I wish that we citizens of Oyster Bay could make here a breathing place for all people of this neighborhood, especially the less fortunate ones.” Only a few months after his death in 1919, the idea of making a park was agreed upon. Over the next six years land was acquired and work to build a park begun. A dedication ceremony was held in May 1928, attended by 5,000 people with a parade and a flyover by planes.

9. Oyster Bay Long Island Rail Road Turntable

Oyster Bay is one of the few remaining stations with an original turntable. It was built in 1902 to replace a smaller one that had been moved to Oyster Bay from Locust Valley at the time of the extending the line. The Turntable is listed by the National Register of Historic Places.

10. Waterfront Center

The area of the shore used by the WaterFront Center used to be the site of Jakobson’s Shipyard. During World War II minesweepers, tugboats, and mini-submarines were produced for the US Navy. Today educational and recreational facilities occupy the site.

A major feature of the educational facilities is the U.S. National Historic Landmark Christeen, which is moored at the WaterFront Center. She is the oldest oyster sloop in the United States having been laid down in 1883. After 30 years of harvesting oysters she was used as a cargo vessel and then a pleasure vessel. In 1989 she was abandoned. Then in 1991 she was bought by a group of Oyster Bay enthusiasts and restored.

Oyster Bay produces up to 90% of the oysters and 40% of the hard clams harvested in New York State. The Christeen serves as a floating classroom to educate students of all ages about the operation of historic vessels and protection of the marine environment of Oyster Bay and Long Island Sound.

11. Captain Kidd in Oyster Bay

Although Richard Coote, the Earl of Bellomont, had been instrumental in securing Kidd's commission as a privateer he later turned against Kidd and other pirates, writing that the inhabitants of Long Island were "a lawless and unruly people" protecting pirates who had "settled among them."

In an attempt to avoid his mutinous crew, who had gathered in New York, Kidd sailed 120 miles around the eastern tip of Long Island, and then doubled back 90 miles along the Sound to Oyster Bay. He felt this was a safer passage than the high-trafficked narrows between Staten Island and Brooklyn.

Kidd arrived in Oyster Bay on June 9, 1699, and anchored offshore. Justice White and Doctor Cooper helped to transmit a message to Kidd's wife in New York, without exposing Kidd and his location. This secrecy was in vain, however, for his location in Oyster Bay was revealed, and just over a month later he was imprisoned in Boston before being shipped back to England for trial.

12. Wightman Memorial Baptist Church

The first Baptist congregation started meeting in Oyster Bay in 1700 and it is the oldest Baptist congregation in the State of New York. The first minister, Robert Feeks was appointed in 1724 gaining him the distinction of being the first ordained minister in Oyster Bay of any denomination.

The original building was a plain unpainted wooden frame structure with flat planked pews and a small pulpit. During the Revolutionary War it was reportedly used to quarter occupying British troops, as were many other churches in the village. The congregation grew steadily and in 1806 a larger church was built on this site.

In 1882 this second building was moved back on the site and rotated 90 degrees to make room for the new church. In 1908, after several years of fundraising the church that is on the site today was completed. The 1806 building was then used as a Baptist church school.

Since the early 1980s the North Shore Assembly of God has made both the buildings their home, and have preserved the interior with all of its original details including carved pews and other woodwork, ornate pressed tin ceilings and walls, a built-in pipe organ, and the original stained glass windows.

13. Octagon Hotel

Luther Jackson built the Nassau House in 1851 to be a political and social meeting space. It was later called the Acker Nassau House. In 1884 the hotel was used for the coroner’s inquest into the murder of three women of the area, Lydia and Annie Maybee of Wolver Hollow and Charlotte Aurelia Townsend of Oyster Bay.

In 1887 Phillip and Mary Lavelle bought the business and renamed it the Octagon Hotel. When Phillip died Mary took over the operations and made many modern improvements which brought patrons from miles around. In 1889 she installed a central heating system which supplied year-round comfort to the guests of the hotel and in 1890 she built a generating plant which provided Oyster Bay’s first electrical lighting. Finding the new phone service offered by the Queens County Telephone and Telegraph Company unsatisfactory, she had her own direct phone line to New York City installed.

Roosevelt's secretary maintained a one-room office believed to have been on the second floor in the Octagon Hotel during 1899. Roosevelt was elected governor in late 1898 and began serving his term in January 1899. The one-room office soon proved to be too small and the staff moved to larger quarters in the nearby Oyster Bay Bank Building.

Mary Lavelle had brought the Octagon Hotel into the 20th century, but a new owner, Charles Davenport, saw his customer base decline as newer hotels in the village competed for clientele. Finally, after ten years, he sold the building to Edward Fisher, who turned it into Oyster Bay’s first Ford automobile dealership. It has been used for various automotive businesses ever since.

It is the only known octagonal building in this part of Long Island and is perhaps the only octagon-shaped hotel in the United States.

A proposal has emerged to restore the building to its original condition. This is presently being reviewed by the Town of Oyster Bay. Community groups have expressed their strong interest to see this building tied to the heritage of Theodore Roosevelt to be restored in a sensitive and thoughtful manner.

14. The Printery

The Oyster Bay Guardian, a weekly newspaper, was founded by Nelson Disbrow in 1899 and over the following six years it was produced from various rented premises. In 1905 the actions of a rival newspaperman caused Disbrow to be unable to continue to rent any property in Oyster Bay. In response Disbrow bought his own property on West Main Street and in 1906 built The Printery, a brown shingled building that still stands today. From this building the Guardian was produced right through to 1967 when the Disbrow family sold it to Edwina Snow. The Printery has remained in use as a print shop.

The Guardian continues to be published to this albeit from different premises.

15. Fort Hill and the Townsend Cemetery

Lt. Colonel John Graves Simcoe ordered his troops to cut down a vast apple orchard which once grew here, and to rebuild the remains of an old fort which stood on this site. Nothing of the old fort remains, but the hill still holds a special significance to the Townsend family; it is one of their earliest graveyards. John Townsend is believed to be the first person buried here in 1668.  His initialed headstone is greatly worn and weathered, but a bronze marker has been added, noting his immigration from England and his original ownership of this land.

16. Raynham Hall Museum

The building housing Raynham Hall Museum has seen several alterations, extensions and restorations since it was initially built in 1738 as a four-room house, with two rooms downstairs and two upstairs. In 1740 a Quaker merchant Samuel Townsend (a descendant of John Townsend, one of the original settlers of Oyster Bay) and his wife moved in. Within a few years their growing family required an extension of four rooms to be built on the back turning the building into a saltbox.

In 1851 Samuel's grandson, Solomon Townsend II, added a three-story water tower in the garden, the result of which was the first kitchen in the town with running water. Solomon then turned his attention to transforming the house into a Victorian villa in the 1870s.

In 1941 the building passed to the Daughters of the American Revolution and then to the Town of Oyster Bay in 1947. The Town Council decided to restore the building to the saltbox structure of the mid-18th century, and in 1959 the Victorian additions were removed, including bay-windows, porte cochere, skylights and the water tower.

The museum is in two parts. In the front of the house the rooms are furnished in the style of the 1770s (the period of the Revolutionary War). The rear of the house, however, is furnished in the style of the 1870s showing the style of living that Solomon had brought to the house.

The building is listed on the National Register of Historic Places and is an active museum open to the public.

17. Seely/Wright House

This house, which is situated directly across the road from the Raynham Hall Museum, was built in 1830 for Dr. Ebeneezer Seely. Seely married Phebe Townsend, the youngest daughter of Samuel Townsend, when she was 45. After her death in 1841, Seely remarried and his daughter from this union married Joseph Wright, a local blacksmith.

Seely, besides his medical duties, served as Town Supervisor of Oyster Bay, School Commissioner, School Inspector and moderated many town meetings. There is a legend that Seely was acquainted with Martin van Buren and that he entertained the President in the Seely House.

Joseph Wright was a descendant of Peter Wright who is regarded as one of the founders of Oyster Bay. Peter Wright and three companions negotiated the purchase of the land from the Matinecock Indians in 1653.

The Wright family continued to occupy the Wright House (as it was then called) for many years.

18. Ludlam Building

James Ludlam opened a dry goods store in 1836 further down the road. Following a fire that started in a neighbouring cabinetmaker's shop and destroyed Ludlam's store, he bought a plot of land and built the two-story building that is known as The Ludlam Building. The building  is in the Greek Revival style. After James' death, the store passed to his sons who later sold it to Roger Royce. Royce operated a grocery store from the site and in 1907 a fire started in the neighbouring Opera House. The local fire company responded to the fire, pumping water from a nearby stream. The Opera House, a private home and a millinery shop were destroyed, but the Ludlam Building and the Post Office were saved with only scorching. Shortly after this fire Royce sold the building to the Kursman brothers, who ran a dry goods and clothing store.

The Kursman’s, later joined by David Bernstein, continued with their business into the 1930s. Then, on April 12, 1932, fire struck again. This time the interior of the Ludlam Building was gutted, including all the inventory and fixtures; only the brick walls remained. Afterwards David Bernstein rebuilt the structure and operated a popular haberdashery called Dave’s Shop for more than thirty years. This brick building survives as one of the oldest commercial storefronts in the village, and for over 20 years it has been the home of Appliance World.

19. Snouders Drug Store

There is doubt as to when the first building was erected on this site but some evidence exists that points to the late 17th century. Snouders Drug Store, located here since 1884, is the oldest continuously operated business in Oyster Bay. The drug store was established by Abel Miller Conklin who had been a druggist in New York City, but moved to the countryside of Oyster Bay in 1880 on the advice of his doctor, who felt the fresh air would improve his health. His first drugstore in Oyster Bay was elsewhere on South Street, but the exact location is not known. In 1884 he relocated and carried on his business with the help of his son-in-law, Andrew Snouder.

Snouder had left the clothing and shoe business to aid his ailing father-in-law. Unfortunately Conklin's health did not recover and soon after the move he died, leaving Snouder to carry on, keeping the name Conklin's Drug Store.

In 1887 Snouder installed the first telephone in Oyster Bay, which for several years remained the only one in town. Until Roosevelt became president even Sagamore Hill did not have a telephone and for several years Snouder's son, Arthur, carried messages up to Roosevelt.

The phone service became a key reason people gathered at Snouders and in May 1900 part of the store was partitioned off for the exclusive use of the telephone service. This enabled the switchboard operated by Miss Ellen Ludlam to remain open late at night until the drugstore had closed. Later that year Snouder graduated second in his class from the New York College of Pharmacy and officially changed the name to Snouders Drug Store.

The telephone also brought many members of the press to the booths of Snouders Drug Store, covering news of Theodore Roosevelt, both as Governor and President.

Following the installation of a soda fountain in 1889 young people congregated at the store as well. This soda fountain became a center of social life for several generations of young people, all the way into the 1970s.

In the 1990s the exterior was returned to its original color, which was determined through paint chip analysis.

20. Hood A.M.E. Zion Church

The Hood African Methodist Episcopal Zion Church, holds the distinction of being the oldest Oyster Bay congregation that is still holding services in their original church structure. The congregation was founded in 1848 by a group of African American families. And in 1856 a small wooden frame building was constructed on land donated to the congregation by Edward Weekes. In 1937, after extensive fundraising, the wooden church was covered a brick exterior.

The original name was the First African Methodist Episcopal Zion Church. However, later on the congregation changed the name to the Hood A.M.E. Zion Church in honor of an early bishop, the Right Reverend James Walker Hood.

Throughout the first fifty years the congregation struggled financially and was unable to pay their pastors for more than a few months at a time. However, by 1937 they were in a position to pay their pastor as well as adding electric light and the brick façade. From 1937 to 1963 the pastor was Moses T. Smith. Today the congregation is led by Reverend Kenneth Nelson, who came to the Hood AME Zion Church in 1981.

21. Earle-Wightman House

This house, named for two 19th-century Baptist ministers who resided in it, was originally built around 1720 as a small one-room dwelling. By 1897 it had been moved round the corner to its current site and extended.

In 1966 the house was donated to the Town of Oyster Bay, for the use of the Oyster Bay Historical Society. The society is headquartered at the house and operates it as a museum, with two rooms interpreted to the period 1740 and 1830.

The 1740 room is set up to illustrate how an 18th-century tradesman might have lived. The 1830 room demonstrates how Rev. Earle would have entertained his guests in the parlor. The garden behind the house has been restored to the 18th century by the North Country Garden Club. It features ornamental plantings along with herbs used for medicinal purposes as well as cooking and fragrance.

The Historical Society also maintains a research Library of books, manuscripts, photographs, maps and documents. The subjects covered by the library include the military, maritime and religious history of Oyster Bay along with a genealogical collection.

22. St. Paul's Methodist Church

The first group of Methodists in Oyster Bay formed in 1812 and used space at the Oyster Bay Academy for services when traveling ministers visited. Then in 1858 the congregation built a small church. In 1895 Joseph B. Wright, the blacksmith, bought the building from them and continued his business there for many years. The congregation then moved to St. Paul's, which they had been working on since 1891.

In 1904 a new pipe organ was installed; half of which was paid for by the wealthy philanthropist Andrew Carnegie. By 1913 the congregation had grown substantially, and to create more room the entire building was raised using a series of jacks. A basement was excavated and several rooms including a kitchen were built.

In the 1920s a forty-foot spire which used to extend above the bell tower was struck by lightning in the 1920s and had to be removed. The “Carnegie” organ no longer exists, and the interior has been given a more modern appearance.

In 1988 St. Paul’s Methodist Churcb merged with another congregation in East Norwich and the Bethel Pentecostal Church moved into this building. Bethel outgrew the building and moved to Westbury, and in 1999 the North Shore Community Church, part of the Presbyterian Church of America, made it their new home, along with the large parsonage next door.

The El Shaddai Pentecostal Church, another local congregation, holds their service in North Shore’s chapel.

The building is listed on the National Register of Historic Places.

23. St. Dominic's Church and Chapel

This Gothic style granite building was first dedicated on Thanksgiving Day in 1897. The original porte cochere provides a covered entrance to the chapel, and once inside one can listen to the original pipe organ. It is one of only three of its kind in the United States, an American-made Hook and Hastings Opus tracker organ, built in 1901. St. Dominic’s Roman Catholic Church has expanded greatly. In 1922 they established a grammar school, and in 1928, a high school. In 1968 they broke ground on a large contemporary church building, located across the street from this one. Today St. Dominic’s six acre campus has eleven buildings.

24. Oyster Bay Public Library

There were several “reading rooms” operated by different groups. In 1893 the People’s Library and Reading Room opened on East Main Street. This building was first constructed in 1901. Theodore Roosevelt laid a cornerstone in 1899 on land donated by Mrs. Harriet Swan. Andrew Carnegie supported the library as well. The brick building you now see to the left occupies the space of the original wood-frame building. The frame house to the right was built in 1890 and later bought and combined with the original building in 1975. In 1994 glass-and-brick additions behind the house were added to further expand the facilities.

25. Stoddard House

Stoddard House, at 107 East Main Street, was built in the 1890s for G. B. Stoddard.  For a number of years from 1980 on, the house was used for offices and museum / historical archives of two organizations, the Townsend Society of America and the Underhill Society of America.  The organizations, founded in 1962 and 1892, preserve genealogical material, deeds, other documents, and artifacts of the Townsend and Underhill families which settled in Oyster Bay in the mid-17th century.  Henry Townsend and Captain John Underhill were two early members of these families.

26. Oyster Bay High School

Several school buildings preceded this one. This Art Deco building replaced the first high school building completed in 1901 on Anstice Street. The new school had modern features, including classroom loudspeakers, an auditorium with balcony and projection booth, a central vacuuming system, and one of the most modern gymnasiums in Nassau County. After 70 years the gym had become outdated. It was replaced in 2000 with a new state-of-the-art gymnasium, dedicated to Dr. Howard Imhof. The 2000 additions also included a new library-media center.

27. Typhoid Mary in Oyster Bay

Mary Mallon worked as a cook in various part of the New York area between 1900 and 1907. One of her positions was with a wealthy New York banker, Charles Henry Warren and his family. When the Warrens rented the home of Mr. and Mrs. George Townsend in Oyster Bay for the summer of 1906, Mallon came along. From August 27 to September 3, six of the eleven people in the house came down with typhoid fever. Typhoid fever in Oyster Bay at that time was "unusual," according to three doctors who practiced medicine there.

The Townsends were worried they would be unable to rent their house and they hired George Soper in the winter of 1906 to investigate. Soper in his investigation published June 15, 1907, in the Journal of the American Medical Association, said he believed soft clams might be the source of the outbreak. He then wrote:

"It was found that the family changed cooks on August 4. This was about three weeks before the typhoid epidemic broke out... She remained in the family only a short time, leaving about three weeks after the outbreak occurred. The cook was described as an Irish woman about 40 years of age, tall, heavy, single. She seemed to be in perfect health."

Soper would later apprehend Mary Mallon in New York, and she was placed in isolation on North Brother Island, not once but twice.

28. Wilson House

This is one of the oldest houses in Oyster Bay still standing on its original site. The saltbox style house dates back to the 1750s. An example of salt box architecture. This refers to south-facing houses with sloping rear sections ending at a height of three or four feet. Two legends persist about famous visitors to the house. Marquis de Talleyrand is reputed to have spent a night in the 1790s while fleeing the ‘Reign of Terror’ in France. President George Washington is reputed to have stopped here and spoken to children from the porch on April 24, 1790.  These legends bring added interest to an already special old home, one of the last of its kind.

29. First Presbyterian Church of Oyster Bay

The first Presbyterian ministry began in Oyster Bay in 1842. After having buildings at a variety of locations they finally located here. In 1872, led by Pastor Benjamin L. Swan, work began on this beautiful church on the hill. The architect was J. Cleveland Cady, who was just beginning his career and would go on to design the original Metropolitan Opera House, the American Museum of History, and other noted buildings. This church was his first though, and the only he would ever design in the unique Carpenter Gothic style. Mr. and Mrs. Theodore Roosevelt, Sr., attended services here, and Mr. Roosevelt’s funeral was held here in 1878.

30. Christ Church of Oyster Bay

Christ Church founded in 1705 is an historic Episcopal parish church in Oyster Bay, New York. Over the years several church buildings have occupied this site, including one that served as soldier's barracks during the Revolutionary War. In the 1870s a Carpenter Gothic style building was erected. In 1925 this was greatly enlarged and encased in stone. Those additions also included striking stained glass windows. President Theodore Roosevelt attended church here, and his wife and children were active members. The church is notable for holding Roosevelt’s funeral service in 1919.

See also
 Theodore Roosevelt in Oyster Bay
 List of Town of Oyster Bay Landmarks
 New York State Historic Markers, Nassau County, Town of Oyster Bay
 National Register of Historic Places listings in Nassau County, New York
 Similar walks:
 Baltimore Heritage Walk
 Boston Freedom Trail
 New London Heritage Trail

References

External links
 Oyster Bay Main Street Association

Tourist attractions in Nassau County, New York
Landmarks in Oyster Bay (town), New York
Historic trails and roads in New York (state)
Urban heritage trails